William Barrowby FRS  FRCP (1682 – 30 December 1758) was an English physician.

Life
Barrowby was born in London, the son of John Barrowby, a physician. He was educated at Eton and Trinity College, Oxford, taking degrees of M.B. in 1709, and of M.D. in 1713. He was elected a fellow of the College of Physicians of London in 1718, and Fellow of the Royal Society in 1721.

References

1681 births
1758 deaths
18th-century English medical doctors
Writers from London
People educated at Eton College
Alumni of Trinity College, Oxford
Fellows of the Royal Society
Fellows of the Royal College of Surgeons
English medical writers
18th-century English non-fiction writers
18th-century English male writers
18th-century English writers